There are two locations with the name Riverside, Maryland:

 Riverside, Charles County, Maryland, an unincorporated community
 Riverside, Harford County, Maryland, a census-designated place